Blanchard Township is one of the fifteen townships of Hardin County, Ohio, United States. As of the 2010 census, the population was 1,533, of whom 658 lived in the unincorporated portions of the township.

Geography
Located in the northern part of the county, it borders the following townships:
Delaware Township, Hancock County - northeast
Jackson Township - east
Pleasant Township - south
Cessna Township - southwest corner
Washington Township - west
Madison Township, Hancock County - northwest

The village of Dunkirk is located in northeastern Blanchard Township.

Name and history
Blanchard Township took its name from the Blanchard River. Statewide, other Blanchard Townships are located in Hancock and Putnam counties.

Government
The township is governed by a three-member board of trustees, who are elected in November of odd-numbered years to a four-year term beginning on the following January 1. Two are elected in the year after the presidential election and one is elected in the year before it. There is also an elected township fiscal officer, who serves a four-year term beginning on April 1 of the year after the election, which is held in November of the year before the presidential election. Vacancies in the fiscal officership or on the board of trustees are filled by the remaining trustees.

References

External links
County website

Townships in Hardin County, Ohio
Townships in Ohio